Marvel's Ant-Man, or simply Ant-Man, is an American animated television series based on the Ant-Man comics published by Marvel Comics. It premiered on June 10, 2017 on Disney XD. Josh Keaton voiced Ant-Man and Melissa Rauch voiced The Wasp. The series was created by Passion Studios' Ugo Bienvenu and Kevin Manach.

Plot
Scott Lang / Ant-Man fights with his enemies such as Yellowjacket, Whirlwind, Egghead and miniature alien invasions with the help of Wasp and Hank Pym.

Characters
Scott Lang / Ant-Man (voiced by Josh Keaton)
Hope van Dyne / Wasp (voiced by Melissa Rauch)
Hank Pym (voiced by Dee Bradley Baker)
Darren Cross / Yellowjacket (voiced by William Salyers)
Cassie Lang (voiced by Laura Bailey)
Alien Leader (voiced by Eric Bauza)
Exterminator (voiced by Nolan North)
Elihas Starr / Egghead (voiced by Sam Riegel)
David Cannon / Whirlwind (voiced by Fred Tatasciore)

Episodes

References

External links

2017 American television series debuts
Animated television shows based on Marvel Comics
2010s American animated television series
Disney XD original programming
2017 American television series endings
Marvel Animation
English-language television shows
Ant-Man
American children's animated superhero television series
Television series by Disney–ABC Domestic Television
American children's animated science fantasy television series
Television series about size change